Compagnie Africaine d'Aviation (CAA; African Aviation Company), renamed FlyCAA in 2013, is a regional airline from the Democratic Republic of the Congo, based at N'djili Airport in Kinshasa. It offers an extensive network of domestic scheduled passenger flights, as well as cargo flights.
Due to safety and security concerns, CAA has been included in the list of air carriers banned in the European Union, along with many other airlines from the Congo.

History

Compagnie Africaine d'Aviation was founded in 1991 and started operations on 26 December 1992. 

In 2013 merged with FlyCongo and formed FlyCAA.

In January 2016, the airline terminated their only international route to Johannesburg after failing to receive renewed traffic rights.

In 2020, the airline acquired an Airbus A330-200 with the stated intention of flying to Brussels, which under current European Union restrictions would require CAA to operate the service using foreign registration and crew.

Destinations 
According to the August 2013 timetable, CAA operates scheduled flights to the following destinations:

Fleet

Current fleet
The FlyCAA fleet consists of the following aircraft (as of August 2019):

Former fleet
Over the years, the following aircraft types were operated:

A Douglas DC-8 had been purchased by CAA and painted in its colors but was never delivered and eventually scrapped at Johannesburg International Airport.

Accidents and incidents
The only fatal accident involving an aircraft of Compagnie d'Aviation Africaine occurred on 4 March 2013, when a Fokker 50 (registered 9Q-CBD) crashed near Goma International Airport. Of the nine people who had been on the flight from Lodja, six were killed. There were however a number of non-fatal incidents which resulted in CAA aircraft being damaged beyond repair:
 On 1 April 1997, a Convair CV-580 (registered 9Q-CRU) was destroyed at Tshikapa Airport when it overshot the runway and hit an embankment following a failed take-off abortion. There were fourteen occupants on board the scheduled flight to Mbuji-Mayi.
 On 18 November 1999, another CV-580 (registered 9Q-CEJ) had to be written off following an off-airport emergency landing near Tshikapa due to an engine failure that had been encountered shortly into the flight to Kananga.
 On 19 November 2009, Flight 3711 from Kinshasa overran the runway upon landing at Goma Airport. Of the 117 occupants on board the aircraft, a McDonnell Douglas MD-82 registered 9Q-CAB, around 20 were injured.
 On 2 January 2010, a cargo-configured Boeing 727 (registered 9Q-CAA) veered off the runway during an emergency landing attempt in heavy rain at N'djili Airport. Previously, the pilots had reported a loss of hydraulic pressure.

See also
 List of airlines of the Democratic Republic of the Congo
 List of companies based in the Democratic Republic of the Congo

References

External links

 Official website

Airlines of the Democratic Republic of the Congo
Airlines established in 1993
Airlines banned in the European Union
Companies based in Kinshasa